The Caprivi Alliance Party was a political party in Namibia. In September 1985, the party merged into the United Democratic Party.

See also
List of political parties in Namibia

References

20th century in Africa
Defunct political parties in Namibia
Political parties disestablished in 1985